Neeta Pillai is an Indian actress from Kerala, India who predominantly working in the Malayalam film industry. She debuted with Poomaram in 2018, alongside Kalidas Jayaram.

Early life 
Neeta was born at Thodupuzha, Kerala to Vijayan P.N. and Manjula D. Nair. She has done Masters in Petroleum engineering from University of Louisiana at Lafayette, United States. She is a trained classical musician and dancer. She has also won second runner-up title of Miss-Bollywood beauty pageant held at Houston in 2015.

Career 
Neeta started her acting in 2018 with Kalidas Jayaram in the film Poomaram, a musical drama film written and directed by Abrid Shine and won Asianet Film Awards for Best New Face of the Year (Female) for her role. She was also nominated for 8th South Indian International Movie Awards (SIIMA) for Best Debut Actress (Malayalam). In 2020, she played the lead role of a martial arts expert in Abrid Shine's The Kung Fu Master. The film was influenced by the action films of Bruce Lee, Jackie Chan and Jet Li and shot at Himalayan Valley, Badrinath and India-China border. She has trained for a year to do action scenes in the film The Kung Fu Master.

Filmography

Films
All films are in Malayalam language unless otherwise noted.

Television

Awards

References 

Living people
Indian film actresses
Actresses from Kerala
21st-century Indian actresses
Actresses in Malayalam cinema
Women artists from Kerala
People from Idukki district
1991 births